Walter Moberly Elementary School is a public elementary school in Vancouver, British Columbia and part of School District 39 Vancouver. The school has grades from Kindergarten through Grade 7. The school was built in 1912.

History 
Walter Moberly Elementary School was first constructed in 1912 at its current site at Khalsa Diwan Rd and East 59th Avenue. The school was named after Walter Moberly, an engineer and surveyor for the Canadian Pacific Survey.

In 1945, the school burned down. It was rebuilt the following year in 1946. An addition of a second gymnasium, 10 classrooms and offices were added to the west side of Moberly in 1999.

Song
Moberly has brought us together,
Yes, Moberly is why we are here,
And when we work in harmony
We come together as one.
 
This is an open invitation,
For every one of you,
To be a part of this celebration,
That's why we share the news.   (Chorus)
 
We know the magic is within us,
And the power too,
Reach for the stars and try your best now.
It's really up to you..... (Chorus)

References

External links
School Reports - Ministry of Education
 Class Size
 Satisfaction Survey
 School Performance
 Skills Assessment

Elementary schools in Vancouver